Joshua Anthony David Lawrenson (born 20 November 2002) is a cricketer who plays for Jersey. In November 2019, he was named in Jersey's squad for the Cricket World Cup Challenge League B tournament in Oman. He made his List A debut, for Jersey against Italy, on 6 December 2019.

In June 2022, he was named in Jersey's squad for the 2022 Uganda Cricket World Cup Challenge League B tournament. On 21 June 2022, in Jersey's match against Italy, Lawrenson scored his first century in List A cricket, with 102 not out.

Lawrenson also represents Durham University.

References

External links
 

2002 births
Living people
Jersey cricketers
Place of birth missing (living people)